Dmitri Belov may refer to:

 Dmitri Belov (footballer, born 1980), Russian football player
 Dmitri Belov (footballer, born 1995), Russian football player